The Sliocht Cormaic of Dunguile, otherwise known as the MacCarthys of Srugrena Abbey, or the Srugrena sept, as well as the Trant McCarthys, are a sept of the MacCarthy Mór dynasty, the Kings of Desmond. They are descendants of a younger son, Cormac of Dunguile, of Tadhg na Mainistreach Mac Carthaigh Mór, King of Desmond (r. 1390/2–1428). The line of the later kings of Desmond, to Donal IX MacCarthy Mór (d. 1596) has long been extinct.

It was into the pedigree of the Srugrena sept that the famous impostor Terence Francis McCarthy inserted himself.

Modern representatives
Playing a crucial role in exposing the impostor Terence McCarthy was the claim by Barry Trant McCarthy, a great nephew of Samuel Trant McCarthy, whose pedigree was accepted and registered in 1906 by the Ulster King of Arms, Sir Arthur Vicars, who also determined the McCarthys of Srugrena to be the senior surviving descendants of the medieval royal family.

See also
 Gaelic nobility of Ireland
 Chief of the Name
 Eóganachta

Notes

References

 Ellis, Peter Berresford, Erin's Blood Royal: The Gaelic Noble Dynasties of Ireland. Palgrave. Revised edition, 2002.
 MacCarthy, Samuel Trant, The MacCarthys of Munster. 1922.

External links
 MacCarthy Clan Foundation
 Kingdom of Desmond Association - An Association Devoted to the Study and Preservation of the History and Legacy of the Kingdom and its Rulers

MacCarthy dynasty
Irish royal families